Originally dispatched in the 19th Century to patrol the Western frontier, the scarlet-clad Mountie on horseback is a well-known image of Canada. Today, the cavalry drills the Royal Canadian Mounted Police (RCMP) practised over a century ago are performed in front of audiences. The Musical Ride is part of Canada's national identity. The images of the RCMP have been featured on various Canadian coins.

The first coins that featured the image of the RCMP were the twenty-five cent and one dollar coins of 1973. Police Constable Paul Cederberg designed both coins. The twenty-five cent coin is unique in that there are two varieties of the coin. A new obverse with a smaller, more detailed portrait and fewer rim denticles placed farther from the rim was planned for use with the RCMP commemorative reverse. A small quantity of coins was struck with the 1972 obverse, thus creating two varieties for the year. The quantity of the large bust has never been confirmed but most publications on Canadian coins estimate that there are approximately 10,000 of these coins. The 1999 Millennium series of 25-cent pieces included the bust of a Mountie on each of the January and July issues.

Unlike the twenty-five cent coin, the Silver Dollar had the same obverse. The only difference with these coins were the cases. One case was black leatherette, with a coat of arms and an insert that was coloured maroon and black. A second case was created and it was blue leatherette with a gilt RCMP crest, with a maroon and black insert.

Twenty-Five Cents

Fifty cents
* This is a numismatic piece and not meant for general circulation.

One Dollar

Seventy-Five Dollars

Two Hundred Dollars
The $200 Gold coin of 1993 celebrated the force’s 130th anniversary. It featured a uniformed member of the famous "RCMP Musical Ride" alongside his horse, speaking with children. The 1994 Silver Dollar depicted the 25th Anniversary of the last northern dog-sled patrol.

Gold Maple Leaf
The 1-ounce gold bullion coin of 1997 bore the likeness of an RCMP Musical Ride member, its face value was $50, but its guaranteed value was US$310 until January 1, 2000. There was some controversy because some felt that the guaranteed value should have been in the issuing currency. The majority of these pieces were sent to the melting pot, so the piece is a relatively scarce item.

Silver Maple Leaf

References

External links

 Royal Canadian Mint's Official Website
 Royal Canadian Mint Act
 Canadian Numismatic Association
 Numismatic Network Canada
 Canadian Coin News

RCMP
Coins